Ekpo Nka-Owo is an Ibibio ancestral spirit that was mostly used to protect marriages between couples. The spirit is said to only attack when a woman commits adultery while in a marriage. It is believed that the spirit torments the wife usually during the birth of a child and it is expected of her to confess to her husband and Ekpri Akata (Spirit of the departed) before she can smoothly deliver a baby. If confession is not done, Ekpri Akata the spirit of the departed will either inflict her or kill her.It is also said to kill the baby while pregnancy in some parts of the ibibio culture

References 

Ibibio mythology
Akwa Ibom State